Yan D. Ruatakurey (born September 7, 1979) is an Indonesian footballer who currently plays for Persiram Raja Ampat in the Indonesia Super League.

Club statistics

References

External links

1979 births
Association football forwards
Living people
Indonesian footballers
Papuan sportspeople
Liga 1 (Indonesia) players
Persiram Raja Ampat players
Place of birth missing (living people)